The Sverdrup Mountains are a group of mountains about  long, standing just west of the Gjelsvik Mountains in Queen Maud Land, East Antarctica.

Discovery and naming
First photographed from the air and roughly plotted by the Third German Antarctic Expedition (3rd GAE), 1938–1939. Mapped in detail by Norwegian cartographers from surveys and aerial photographs taken by the Norwegian–British–Swedish Antarctic Expedition (NBSAE), and again by a later Norwegian expedition. Named for Harald Sverdrup, Chairman of the Norwegian Committee for the NBSAE.

Norwegian–British–Swedish Antarctic Expedition
Norwegian–British–Swedish Antarctic Expedition (NBSAE), 1949–1952

Norwegian Expedition
Luncke Expedition, 1958–1959

List of important geographical features of the Sverdrup Mountains

See also
 List of mountains of Queen Maud Land
 Nils Plain

References

External links

 United States Geological Survey, Geographic Names Information System (GNIS)

  

Mountain ranges of Queen Maud Land